The city of Adel  is the county seat of Cook County, Georgia, United States, located  southeast of Albany. As of the 2020 census, the city had a population of 5,571.

History
The original name of the city was Puddleville. The city's first postmaster, Joel "Uncle Jack" Parrish, wanted to change the name of the city. It is believed that he saw the name "Philadelphia" on a croaker sack and struck out the first and last four letters to create the present name of Adel.

The Georgia Southern and Florida Railway arrived in Adel in the 1880s. Adel was incorporated as a town in 1889.

Tornadoes
On January 22, 2017, a low-end EF3 tornado struck the extreme southern portion of Adel. Sunshine Acres, a local mobile home park, experienced severe damage, with over 20 homes destroyed and others damaged; seven residents were killed and an indeterminate number were injured or displaced. The tornado ultimately killed 14 people. An EF1 tornado also moved through the city on April 23, 2020 On January 22, 2023, a low-end EF2 tornado caused major damage on the north side of town.

Geography
Adel is located just south of the center of Cook County at  (31.138466, -83.425944). It is bordered to the north by Sparks. U.S. Route 41 passes through the center of town as Hutchinson Avenue, and Interstate 75 passes through the western side of the city, with access from Exit 39.

Demographics

2020 census

As of the 2020 United States census, there were 5,571 people, 2,111 households, and 1,108 families residing in the city.

2000 census
As of the census of 2000, there were 5,307 people, 1,958 households, and 1,335 families residing in the city. The racial makeup of the city was 48.92% African American, 47.97% White, 0.08% Native American, 0.75% Asian, 0.09% Pacific Islander, 1.43% from other races, and 0.75% from two or more races. Hispanic or Latino of any race were 3.79% of the population.

There were 1,958 households, out of which 33.9% had children under the age of 18 living with them, 43.0% were married couples living together, 20.8% had a female householder with no husband present, and 31.8% were non-families. 27.9% of all households were made up of individuals, and 12.3% had someone living alone who was 65 years of age or older. The average household size was 2.60 and the average family size was 3.17.

In the city, the population was spread out, with 29.4% under the age of 18, 9.4% from 18 to 24, 26.1% from 25 to 44, 20.0% from 45 to 64, and 15.2% who were 65 years of age or older. The median age was 34 years. For every 100 females, there were 86.3 males. For every 100 females age 18 and over, there were 83.5 males.

The median income for a household in the city was $23,908, and the median income for a family was $27,318. Males had a median income of $25,927 versus $19,688 for females. The per capita income for the city was $13,425. About 23.5% of families and 27.4% of the population were below the poverty line, including 36.6% of those under age 18 and 29.2% of those age 65 or over.

Notable people

 Ray McKinnon – actor and producer
 Kaleb Cowart – baseball player (LA Angels 2015–2019)

Education

Cook County School District 
The Cook County School District holds pre-school to grade twelve, and consists of two elementary schools, a middle school, and a high school. The district has 188 full-time teachers and over 3,215 students.
Cook Primary School
Cook Elementary School
Cook Middle School
Cook High School

Library
Adel is served by the Cook County Public Library.

Climate
The climate in this area is characterized by relatively high temperatures and evenly distributed precipitation throughout the year. According to the Köppen Climate Classification system, Adel has a humid subtropical climate, abbreviated "Cfa" on climate maps.

References

External links
 City of Adel official website
 Adel Lime Sink historical marker

Cities in Georgia (U.S. state)
Cities in Cook County, Georgia
County seats in Georgia (U.S. state)